The year 2003 in art involves various significant events.

Events
January 21 – The Spire of Dublin is completed. 
May 11 – Benvenuto Cellini's Saliera is stolen from the Kunsthistorisches Museum in Vienna.
June 15-November 2 - A record number of seven co-curators is involved in the 50th edition of the Venice Biennale, directed by Francesco Bonami. 
November – Gustav Klimt's Landhaus am Attersee sells for $29,128,000.
December 25 – Beagle 2 lands on the surface of Mars; its calibration target plate is painted by Damien Hirst.
date unknown - Central Saint Martins College of Art and Design takes over the Byam Shaw School of Art.

Exhibitions
Jim Sanborn, Critical Assembly, Corcoran School of Art
Patti Smith, Strange Messenger, The Andy Warhol Museum in Pittsburgh

Awards
Archibald Prize – Geoffrey Dyer, a portrait of Richard Flanagan
Beck's Futures – Rosalind Nashashibi
Schock Prize in Visual Arts – Susan Rothenberg
Turner Prize – Grayson Perry
The Venice Biennale (June 15 - November 2) -
The Lion d'Or Golden Lion for Lifetime Achievement: Michelangelo Pistoletto (Italy) and Carol Rama (Italy)
The Lion d'or for best artwork in the main exhibition: Fischli and Weiss (Switzerland)
The Lion d'Or for Best Pavilion: Sun-Mei Tse (Luxemburg)
Wynne Prize – Tim Kyle, Seated Figure

Works

 Eco-Earth Globe, Salem, Oregon
Jake and Dinos Chapman – Insult to Injury
Tony Cragg – Stainless Steel Pillar
Olafur Eliasson – The weather project (installation in Turbine Hall of Tate Modern, London)
Cornelia Parker – The Distance (A Kiss With String Attached): Subconscious of a Monument (interventionist sculpture)
Michal Rovner - "Data Zone"
Jørn Utzon - Homage to Carl Philipp Emanuel Bach (tapestry in the Sydney Opera House)
Kehinde Wiley - Go
David Fairbairn - "Self Portrait DF"

Deaths

January to March
9 January – Constantin Kluge, Russian and French painter (b.1912)
20 January – Al Hirschfeld, American caricaturist (b.1903).
21 January – Tony O'Malley, Irish painter (b.1913).
27 January – Louis Archambault, Canadian sculptor (b.1915).
2 February – Emerson Woelffer, American painter (b.1914).
10 February – Edgar de Evia, Mexican-born American photographer (b.1910).
14 March – Jack Goldstein, Canadian-born American performance and conceptual artist turned painter (b.1945).

April to June
9 April – Jorge Oteiza, Spanish sculptor, painter, designer and writer (b.1908).
16 April – Graham Stuart Thomas, English horticultural artist, author and garden designer (b.1909).
23 April – Fernand Fonssagrives, French photographer (b.1910).
25 April – Lynn Chadwick, 88, English sculptor  
29 May – Pierre Restany, French art critic and cultural philosopher (b.1930).
7 June – Georges Pichard, French comics artist (b.1920).

July to September
11 July - Dorothy Miller, 99, American curator (b.1904).
15 August – Kirk Varnedoe, American art historian, writer and curator (b.1946).
21 August – Wesley Willis, American artist and musician (b.1963).
29 August – Vladimír Vašíček, Czech painter (b.1919).
1 September – Terry Frost, English artist noted for his abstracts (b.1915).

October to December
3 October – William Steig, American cartoonist, sculptor and author (b.1907).
16 October – Avni Arbaş, Turkish artist (b.1919).
9 November – Mario Merz, Italian artist (b.1925).
4 December – David Vaughan, English psychedelic artist and muralist (b. 1944).
15 December – George Fisher, American political cartoonist (b.1923).
17 December – Wally Hedrick, American artist (b.1928).

References

 
 
2000s in art
Years of the 21st century in art